State Highway 43 (SH 43) is a Texas state highway that runs from Henderson to Atlanta.

Previous routes

 SH 43 was originally proposed on April 23, 1919, to connect SH 42 15 miles north of Longview to Rusk via Henderson. That same day, an intercounty highway was designated from SH 43's north end to Naples. On April 19, 1920, SH 43 was extended north to the Oklahoma border via Daingerfield. On August 21, 1923, the route had been further changed. The section from Henderson to Longview was transferred to SH 26, the section from Daingerfield to Omaha was transferred to SH 11, and the section from Clarksville to Oklahoma was transferred to SH 66, and the section from Henderson to Rusk transferred to SH 43A. The sections from Clarksville to Omaha and from Daingerfield to Longview were cancelled. (Daingerfield to Longview would later be restored as an extension of SH 149). SH 43 was reassigned to former SH 43A from Kilgore to Taylor, a new route to Leander, and SH 20 to Mason. On December 17, 1923, SH 43 was rerouted to end in Marshall. On January 21, 1924, SH 43 was truncated to Taylor, with the section from Taylor to Round Rock already part of SH 2B, Round Rock to Leander cancelled and Leander to Mason transferred to SH 29. On April 6, 1932, SH 43 was extended back to Round Rock, replacing part of SH 2B. On February 9, 1933, SH 43 was extended northeast to Karnack. On January 18, 1935, it extended to Caddo Lake Park. On February 11, 1935, SH 43 Loop was designated through Tatum. On July 15, 1935, the section from Karnack to Caddo Lake Park was cancelled. This section was restored on February 11, 1937. On September 26, 1939, the section from Round Rock to Palestine had been transferred to U.S. Highway 79 (cosigned starting in 1934). SH 43 Loop was renumbered as Loop 43. On December 16, 1943, another section was created from SH 49 to US 59 in Atlanta, replacing SH 300 and creating a gap in the route. On August 30, 1950, the section from Karnack to Caddo Lake Park was transferred to FM 134. On June 1, 1967, the section from what was then FM 1915 to FM 134 was renumbered as Spur 449. Instead, SH 43 was rerouted over FM 1915, which was decommissioned, closing the gap. On October 31, 2013, a section from SH 77 to US 59 was given to the city of Atlanta.

 SH 43A was originally designated on January 19, 1920, as an alternate route to SH 43, splitting in Kilgore and running southwest to Troup. On November 21, 1917, an intercounty highway was designated from Taylor to Hearne. SH 44A was designated on July 20, 1920, along the part of the intercounty highway from Taylor to Milano. On January 17, 1921, SH 43A extended southwest through Palestine to Taylor along a new route to Hearne, the intercounty highway from Hearne to Milano, and SH 44A from Milano to Taylor. On August 21, 1923, the entire route had been transferred to the main route of SH 43. SH 43A was instead designated from Palestine to Henderson, replacing the original SH 43 and part of SH 22. On December 17, 1923, it was cancelled. On February 18, 1924, it was restored, but it ended at New Summerfield instead. On September 17, 1929, it was rerouted east to Mount Enterprise. On March 19, 1930, this route became an extension of SH 22.

Major junctions

References

043
Transportation in Rusk County, Texas
Transportation in Panola County, Texas
Transportation in Harrison County, Texas
Transportation in Marion County, Texas
Transportation in Cass County, Texas